Johnny Bravo Goes to Bollywood is a 2011 animated made-for-television comedy film based on the animated television series Johnny Bravo created by Van Partible. It premiered on Cartoon Network in Australia and New Zealand on November 4, 2011.

The name resembles the season 4 premiere "Johnny Bravo Goes to Hollywood".

Plot
After watching a True Hollywood Stories-type documentary in which he is considered a forgotten star, Johnny Bravo travels to Mumbai, the entertainment capital of India, to prove himself he is still popular, confusing Bollywood, India, with Hollywood and Indiana respectively. Eventually Johnny finds himself in the middle of a murder plot to kill Bollywood's greatest star, Jiggy (Johnny's Indian equivalent and rival).

Cast
 Jeff Bennett - Johnny Bravo
 Brenda Vaccaro - Bunny Bravo
 Tara Strong - Additional voices
 Sunil Malhotra - Jiggy
 Sheetal Sheth - Sumi Shark
 Ajay Mehta - Bollywood Producer
 Tom Kenny - Additional voices
 Cree Summer - Additional Voices

Notes

 Despite Johnny Bravo being incredibly popular in India, the movie only aired on TV in Australia and New Zealand back in 2011 and hasn't aired on any other international TV networks. 
 Although it never aired on TV in the United States or Canada, it's now available to stream on HBO Max.

References

External links
 

2011 films
2011 comedy films
2011 animated films
2011 television films
2010s American animated films
2010s children's comedy films
2010s children's animated films
2010s English-language films
American children's animated comedy films
Johnny Bravo
Animated films based on animated television series
Television films based on television series
Films about Bollywood
Films set in Mumbai
Animated films set in the United States
Cartoon Network Studios animated films